The Donbas or Donbass is a historical, cultural, and economic region in eastern Ukraine. Parts of the Donbas are occupied by Russia as a result of the Russo-Ukrainian War.

The word Donbas is a portmanteau formed from "Donets Basin", an abbreviation of "Donets Coal Basin". The name of the coal basin is a reference to the Donets Ridge; the latter is associated with the Donets river.

There are numerous definitions of the region's extent. It is now most commonly defined as the Donetsk and Luhansk regions of Ukraine. The historical coal mining region excluded parts of these oblasts, and included areas in Dnipropetrovsk Oblast and Southern Russia. A Euroregion of the same name is composed of Donetsk and Luhansk oblasts in Ukraine and Rostov Oblast in Russia.

The Donbas formed the historical border between the Zaporizhian Sich and the Don Cossack Host. It has been an important coal mining area since the late 19th century, when it became a heavily industrialised territory.

In March 2014, following the Euromaidan protest movement and the resulting Revolution of Dignity, large swaths of the Donbas became gripped by pro-Russian and anti-government unrest. This unrest later grew into a war between Ukrainian government forces and Russian forces together with Russian militias, who were supported by Russia as part of the broader Russo-Ukrainian War. The conflict split the Donbas split Ukrainian-held territory, constituting about two-thirds of the region, and separatist/Russian-held territory, constituting about one-third. The region remained this way for years until Russia launched a full-scale invasion of Ukraine. On 30 September 2022, Russia unilaterally declared its annexation of Donbas together with two other Ukrainian oblasts, Kherson and Zaporizhzhia.

The city of Donetsk (the fifth largest city in Ukraine) is considered the unofficial capital of the Donbas. Other large cities (over 100,000 inhabitants) include Luhansk, Makiivka, Horlivka, Kramatorsk, Mariupol, Alchevsk, Lysychansk, and Sievierodonetsk.

History

Ancient, mediaeval and imperial Russian periods

The Kurgan hypothesis places the Pontic steppes of Ukraine and southern Russia as the linguistic homeland of the Proto-Indo-Europeans. The Yamnaya culture is identified with the late Proto-Indo-Europeans. 

The region has been inhabited for centuries by various nomadic tribes, such as Scythians, Alans, Huns, Bulgars, Pechenegs, Kipchaks, Turco-Mongols, Tatars and Nogais. The region now known as the Donbas was largely unpopulated until the second half of the 17th century, when Don Cossacks established the first permanent settlements in the region.

The first town in the region was founded in 1676, called Solanoye (now Soledar), which was built for the profitable business of exploiting newly discovered rock-salt reserves. Known for being "Wild Fields" (dyke pole), the area that is now called the Donbas was largely under the control of the Ukrainian Cossack Hetmanate and the Turkic Crimean Khanate until the mid-late 18th century, when the Russian Empire conquered the Hetmanate and annexed the Khanate.

In the second half of the 17th century, settlers and fugitives from Hetman's Ukraine and Muscovy settled the lands north of the Donets river. At the end of the 18th century, many Russians, Ukrainians, Serbs and Greeks migrated to lands along the southern course of the Donets river, into an area previously inhabited by nomadic Nogais, who were nominally subject to the Crimean Khanate. Tsarist Russia named the conquered territories "New Russia" (Novorossiya). As the Industrial Revolution took hold across Europe, the vast coal resources of the region, discovered in 1721, began to be exploited in the mid-late 19th century.

It was at this point that the name Donbas came into use, derived from the term "Donets Coal Basin", referring to the area along the Donets river where most of the coal reserves were found. The rise of the coal industry led to a population boom in the region, largely driven by Russian settlers. The region was governed as the Bakhmut, Slovianserbsk and Mariupol counties of Yekaterinoslav Governorate.

Donetsk, the most important city in the region today, was founded in 1869 by Welsh businessman John Hughes on the site of the old Zaporozhian Cossack town of Oleksandrivka. Hughes built a steel mill and established several collieries in the region. The city was named after him as "Yuzovka". With the development of Yuzovka and similar cities, large numbers of landless peasants from peripheral governorates of the Russian Empire came looking for work.

According to the Russian Imperial Census of 1897, Ukrainians ("Little Russians", in the official imperial language) accounted for 52.4% of the population of the region, whilst ethnic Russians constituted 28.7%. Ethnic Greeks, Germans, Jews and Tatars also had a significant presence in the Donbas, particularly in the district of Mariupol, where they constituted 36.7% of the population. Despite this, Russians constituted the majority of the industrial workforce. Ukrainians dominated rural areas, but cities were often inhabited solely by Russians who had come seeking work in the region's heavy industries. Those Ukrainians who did move to the cities for work were quickly assimilated into the Russian-speaking worker class.

Russian Civil War and Soviet period (1918–1941)

In April 1918 troops loyal to the Ukrainian People's Republic took control of large parts of the region. For a while, its government bodies operated in the Donbas alongside their Russian Provisional Government equivalents. The Ukrainian State, the successor of the Ukrainian People's Republic, was able in May 1918 to bring the region under its control for a short time with the help of its German and Austro-Hungarian allies.

During the 1917–22 Russian Civil War, Nestor Makhno, who commanded the Revolutionary Insurgent Army of Ukraine, was the most popular leader in the Donbas.

Along with other territories inhabited by Ukrainians, the Donbas was incorporated into the Ukrainian Soviet Socialist Republic in the aftermath of the Russian Civil War. Cossacks in the region were subjected to decossackisation during 1919–1921. Ukrainians in the Donbas were greatly affected by the 1932–33 Holodomor famine and the Russification policy of Joseph Stalin. As most ethnic Ukrainians were rural peasant farmers, they bore the brunt of the famine.

Nazi occupation (1941–1943)

The Donbas was greatly affected by the Second World War. In the lead-up to the war, the region was racked by poverty and food shortages. War preparations resulted in an extension of the working day for factory labourers, whilst those who deviated from the heightened standards were arrested. Nazi Germany's leader Adolf Hitler viewed the resources of the Donbas as critical to Operation Barbarossa. As such, the Donbas suffered under Nazi occupation during 1941 and 1942.

Thousands of industrial labourers were deported to Nazi Germany for use in factories. In what was then called Stalino Oblast, now Donetsk Oblast, 279,000 civilians were killed over the course of the occupation. In Voroshilovgrad Oblast, now Luhansk Oblast, 45,649 were killed.

In 1943 the Operation Little Saturn and Donbas strategic offensive by the Red Army resulted in the return of Donbas to Soviet control. The war had taken its toll, leaving the region both destroyed and depopulated.

Soviet period (1943–1991)
During the reconstruction of the Donbas after the end of the Second World War, large numbers of Russian workers arrived to repopulate the region, further altering the population balance. In 1926, 639,000 ethnic Russians resided in the Donbas. By 1959, the ethnic Russian population was 2.55 million. Russification was further advanced by the 1958–59 Soviet educational reforms, which led to the near elimination of all Ukrainian-language schooling in the Donbas. By the time of the Soviet Census of 1989, 45% of the population of the Donbas reported their ethnicity as Russian. In 1990, the Interfront of the Donbass was founded as a movement against Ukrainian independence.

In independent Ukraine (from 1991)

In the 1991 referendum on Ukrainian independence, 83.9% of voters in Donetsk Oblast and 83.6% in Luhansk Oblast supported independence from the Soviet Union. Turnout was 76.7% in Donetsk Oblast and 80.7% in Luhansk Oblast. In October 1991, a congress of South-Eastern deputies from all levels of government took place in Donetsk, where delegates demanded federalisation.

The region's economy deteriorated severely in the ensuing years. By 1993, industrial production had collapsed, and average wages had fallen by 80% since 1990. The Donbas fell into crisis, with many accusing the new central government in Kyiv of mismanagement and neglect. Donbas coal miners went on strike in 1993, causing a conflict that was described by historian Lewis Siegelbaum as "a struggle between the Donbas region and the rest of the country". One strike leader said that Donbas people had voted for independence because they wanted "power to be given to the localities, enterprises, cities", not because they wanted heavily centralised power moved from "Moscow to Kyiv".

This strike was followed by a 1994 consultative referendum on various constitutional questions in Donetsk and Luhansk oblasts, held concurrently with the first parliamentary elections in independent Ukraine. These questions included whether Russian should be declared an official language of Ukraine, whether Russian should be the language of administration in Donetsk and Luhansk oblasts, whether Ukraine should federalise, and whether Ukraine should have closer ties with the Commonwealth of Independent States.

Close to 90% of voters voted in favour of these propositions. None of them were adopted since the vote was nationwide. Ukraine remained a unitary state, Ukrainian was retained as the sole official language, and the Donbas gained no autonomy. Nevertheless, the Donbas strikers gained many economic concessions from Kyiv, allowing for an alleviation of the economic crisis in the region.

Small strikes continued throughout the 1990s, though demands for autonomy faded. Some subsidies to Donbas heavy industries were eliminated, and many mines were closed by the Ukrainian government because of liberalising reforms pushed for by the World Bank. Leonid Kuchma, who had won the 1994 presidential election with support from the Donbas and other areas in eastern Ukraine, was re-elected as president of Ukraine in 1999. President Kuchma gave economic aid to the Donbas, using development money to gain political support in the region.

Power in the Donbas became concentrated in a regional political elite, known as oligarchs, during the early 2000s. Privatisation of state industries led to rampant corruption. Regional historian Hiroaki Kuromiya described this elite as the "Donbas clan", a group of people that controlled economic and political power in the region. Prominent members of the "clan" included Viktor Yanukovych and Rinat Akhmetov.

A brief attempt at gaining autonomy by pro-Viktor Yanukovych politicians and officials was made in 2004 during the Orange Revolution. The so-called South-East Ukrainian Autonomous Republic was intended to consist out of nine South-Eastern regions of Ukraine. The project was initiated on 26 November 2004 by the Luhansk Oblast Council, and was discontinued the next month by the Donetsk Oblast Council. On 28 November 2004, in Sievierodonetsk, the so-called  took place, organised by the supporters of Viktor Yanukovych.

A total of 3,576 delegates from 16 oblasts of Ukraine, Crimea and Sevastopol took part in the congress, claiming to represent over 35 million citizens. Moscow Mayor Yurii Luzhkov and an advisor from the Russian Embassy were present in the presidium. There were calls for the appointment of Viktor Yanukovych as president of Ukraine or prime minister, for declaring of martial law in Ukraine, dissolution of the Verkhovna Rada, creation of self-defence forces, and for the creation of a federative South-Eastern state with its capital in Kharkiv.

Donetsk Mayor Oleksandr Lukyanchenko, however, stated that no one wanted autonomy, but rather sought to stop the Orange Revolution demonstrations going on at the time in Kyiv and negotiate a compromise. After the Orange Revolution's victory, some of the organisers of the congress were charged with "encroachment upon the territorial integrity and inviolability of Ukraine", but no convictions were made.

In other parts of Ukraine during the 2000s, the Donbas was often perceived as having a "thug culture", as being a "Soviet cesspool", and as "backward". Writing in the Narodne slovo newspaper in 2005, commentator Viktor Tkachenko said that the Donbas was home to "fifth columns", and that speaking Ukrainian in the region was "not safe for one's health and life". It was also portrayed as being home to pro-Russian separatism. The Donbas is home to a significantly higher number of cities and villages that were named after Communist figures compared to the rest of Ukraine. Despite this portrayal, surveys taken across that decade and during the 1990s showed strong support for remaining within Ukraine and insignificant support for separatism.

Russo-Ukrainian War (2014–present)

War in Donbas 

From the beginning of March 2014, demonstrations by pro-Russian and anti-government groups took place in the Donbas, as part of the aftermath of the Revolution of Dignity and the Euromaidan movement. These demonstrations, which followed the annexation of Crimea by the Russian Federation, and which were part of a wider group of concurrent pro-Russian protests across southern and eastern Ukraine, escalated in April 2014 into a war between the Russian-backed separatist forces of the self-declared Donetsk and Luhansk People's Republics (DPR and LPR respectively), and the Ukrainian government.

Amid that conflict, the self-proclaimed republics held referendums on the status of Donetsk and Luhansk oblasts on 11 May 2014. In the referendums, viewed as illegal by Ukraine and undemocratic by the international community, about 90% voted for the independence of the DPR and LPR.

The initial protests in the Donbas were largely native expressions of discontent with the new Ukrainian government. Russian involvement at this stage was limited to its voicing of support for the demonstrations. The emergence of the separatists in Donetsk and Luhansk began as a small fringe group of the protesters, independent of Russian control. This unrest, however, only evolved into an armed conflict because of Russian military backing for what had been a marginal group as part of the Russo-Ukrainian War. The conflict was thus, in the words of historian Hiroaki Kuromiya, "secretly engineered and cleverly camouflaged by outsiders".

There was limited support for separatism in the Donbas before the outbreak of the war, and little evidence of support for an armed uprising. Russian claims that Russian speakers in the Donbas were being persecuted or even subjected to "genocide" by the Ukrainian government, forcing its hand to intervene, were deemed false.

Fighting continued through the summer of 2014, and by August 2014, the Ukrainian "Anti-Terrorist Operation" was able to vastly shrink the territory under the control of the pro-Russian forces, and came close to regaining control of the Russo-Ukrainian border. In response to the deteriorating situation in the Donbas, Russia abandoned what has been called its "hybrid war" approach, and began a conventional invasion of the region. As a result of the Russian invasion, DPR and LPR insurgents regained much of the territory they had lost during the Ukrainian government's preceding military offensive.

Only this Russian intervention prevented an immediate Ukrainian resolution to the conflict. This forced the Ukrainian side to seek the signing of a ceasefire agreement. Called the Minsk Protocol, this was signed on 5 September 2014. As this failed to stop the fighting, another agreement, called Minsk II was signed on 12 February 2015. This agreement called for the eventual reintegration of the Donbas republics into Ukraine, with a level of autonomy. The aim of the Russian intervention in the Donbas was to establish pro-Russian governments that, upon reincorporation into Ukraine, would facilitate Russian interference in Ukrainian politics. The Minsk agreements were thus highly favourable to the Russian side, as their implementation would accomplish these goals.

The conflict led to a vast exodus from the Donbas: half the region's population were forced to flee their homes. A UN OHCHR report released on 3 March 2016 stated that, since the conflict broke out in 2014, the Ukrainian government registered 1.6 million internally displaced people who had fled the Donbas to other parts of Ukraine. Over 1 million were said to have fled elsewhere, mostly to Russia. At the time of the report, 2.7 million people were said to continue to live in areas under DPR and LPR control, comprising about one-third of the Donbas.

Despite the Minsk agreements, low-intensity fighting along the line of contact between Ukrainian government and Russian-controlled areas continued until 2022. Since the start of the conflict there have been 29 ceasefires, each intended to remain in force indefinitely, but none of them stopped the violence. This led the war to be referred to as a "frozen conflict".
On 11 January 2017, the Ukrainian government approved a plan to reintegrate the occupied part of the Donbas and its population into Ukraine. The plan would give Russian-backed political entities partial control of the electorate and has been described by Zerkalo Nedeli as "implanting a cancerous cell into Ukraine's body." This was never implemented, and was subject to public protest.

A 2018 survey by Sociological Group "Rating" of residents of the Ukrainian-controlled parts of the Donbas found that 82% of respondents believed there was no discrimination against Russian-speaking people in Ukraine. Only 11% saw some evidence of discrimination. The same survey also found that 71% of respondents did not support Russia's military intervention to "protect" the Russian-speaking population, with only 9% offering support for that action. Another survey by Rating, conducted in 2019, found that only 23% of those Ukrainians polled supported granting the Donbas autonomous status, whilst 34% supported a ceasefire and "freezing" the conflict, 23% supported military action to recover the occupied Donbas territories, and 6% supported separating these territories from Ukraine.

Full-scale Russian invasion of Ukraine 

On 21 February 2022, Russia officially recognised the independence of the Donetsk and Luhansk republics, effectively killing the Minsk agreements. Russia subsequently launched a new, full-scale invasion of Ukraine on 24 February 2022, which Russian president Vladimir Putin said was intended to "protect" the people of the Donbas from the "abuse" and "genocide" of the Ukrainian government. However, Putin's claims have been refuted. The DPR and LPR joined Russia's operation; the separatists stated that an operation to capture the entirety of Donetsk Oblast and Luhansk Oblast had begun.

On 18 April 2022, the Battle of Donbas began.

Demographics and politics

According to the 2001 census, ethnic Ukrainians form 58% of the population of Luhansk Oblast and 56.9% of Donetsk Oblast. Ethnic Russians form the largest minority, accounting for 39% and 38.2% of the two oblasts respectively. In the present day, the Donbas is a predominately Russophone region. According to the 2001 census, Russian is the main language of 74.9% of residents in Donetsk Oblast and 68.8% in Luhansk Oblast. The proportion of native Russian-speakers is higher than ethnic Russians because some ethnic Ukrainians and other nationalities also indicate Russian as their mother tongue.

Residents of Russian origin are mainly concentrated in the larger urban centers. Russian became the main language and lingua franca in the course of industrialization, boosted by the immigration of many Russians, particularly from Kursk Oblast, to newly founded cities in the Donbas. A subject of continuing research controversies, and often denied in these two oblasts, is the extent of forced emigration and deaths during the Soviet period, which particularly affected rural Ukrainians during the Holodomor which resulted as a consequence of early Soviet industrialization policies combined with two years of drought throughout southern Ukraine and the Volga region.

Nearly all Ukrainian Jews either fled or were murdered in the Holocaust in Ukraine during the German occupation in World War II. The Donbas is about 6% Muslim according to the official censuses of 1926 and 2001.

Prior to the Revolution of Dignity, the politics of the region were dominated by the pro-Russian Party of Regions, which gained about 50% of Donbas votes in the 2008 Ukrainian parliamentary election. Prominent members of that party, such as former Ukrainian president Viktor Yanukovych, were from the Donbas.

According to linguist George Shevelov, in the early 1920s the proportion of secondary schools teaching in the Ukrainian language was lower than the proportion of ethnic Ukrainians in the Donbas – even though the Soviet Union had ordered that all schools in the Ukrainian SSR should be Ukrainian-speaking (as part of its Ukrainization policy).

Surveys of regional identities in Ukraine have shown that around 40% of Donbas residents claim to have a "Soviet identity". Roman Horbyk of Södertörn University wrote that in the 20th century, "[a]s peasants from all surrounding regions were flooding its then busy mines and plants on the border of ethnically Ukrainian and Russian territories", "incomplete and archaic institutions" prevented Donbas residents from "acquiring a notably strong modern urban – and also national – new identity".

Religion

According to a 2016 survey of religion in Ukraine held by the Razumkov Center, 65.0% of the population in the Donbas believe in Christianity (including 50.6% Orthodox, 11.9% who declared themselves to be "simply Christians", and 2.5% who belonged to Protestant churches). Islam is the religion of 6% of the population of the Donbas and Hinduism of the 0.6%, both the religions with a share of the population that is higher compared to other regions of Ukraine. People who declared to be not believers or believers in some other religions, not identifying in one of those listed, were 28.3% of the population.

Economy

The Donbas economy is dominated by heavy industry, such as coal mining and metallurgy. The region takes its name from an abbreviation of the term "Donets Coal Basin", and while annual extraction of coal has decreased since the 1970s, the Donbas remains a significant producer. The Donbas represents one of the largest coal reserves in Ukraine, with estimated reserves of 60 billion tonnes of coal.

Coal mining in the Donbas is conducted at very deep depths. Prior to the start of the region's war in April 2014, Donetsk and Luhansk oblasts together produced about 30 percent of Ukraine's exports.

Other industries in the Donetsk region include blast-furnace and steel-making equipment, railway freight-cars, metal-cutting machine-tools, tunneling machines, agricultural harvesters and ploughing systems, railway tracks, mining cars, electric locomotives, military vehicles, tractors and excavators. The region also produces consumer goods like household washing-machines, refrigerators, freezers, TV sets, leather footwear, and toilet soap. Over half its production is exported, and about 22% is exported to Russia.

In mid-March 2017, Ukrainian president Petro Poroshenko signed a decree on a temporary ban on the movement of goods to and from territory controlled by the self-proclaimed Donetsk People's Republic and Luhansk People's Republic, so since then Ukraine does not buy coal from the Donets Coal Basin.

Shale gas reserves, part of the larger Dnieper–Donets basin, are present in the Donbas, most notably the Yuzivska gas field. In an effort to reduce Ukrainian dependence on Russian gas imports, the Ukrainian government reached an agreement with Royal Dutch Shell in 2012 to develop the Yuzivska field. Shell was forced to freeze operations after the outbreak of war in the region in 2014, and officially withdrew from the project in June 2015.

Occupational safety in the coal industry
The coal mines of the Donbas are some of the most hazardous in the world because of the deep depths of mines, as well as frequent methane explosions, coal-dust explosions, rock burst dangers, and outdated infrastructure. Even more hazardous illegal coal mines became very common across the region in the late 2000s.

Environmental problems

Intensive coal-mining and smelting in the Donbas have led to severe damage to the local environment. The most common problems throughout the region include:
water-supply disruption and flooding due to the mine water
visible air pollution around coke and steel mills
air/water contamination and mudslide threat from spoil tips
Additionally, several chemical waste-disposal sites in the Donbas have not been maintained, and pose a constant threat to the environment. One unusual threat is the result of the Soviet-era  to test experimental nuclear mining in Yenakiieve. For example, on 16 September 1979, at the Yunkom Mine, known today as the Young Communard mine in Yenakiyeve, a 300kt nuclear test explosion was conducted at 900m to free methane gas or to degasified coal seams into a sandstone oval dome known as the Klivazh [Rift] Site so that methane would not pose a hazard or threat to life. Before Glasnost, no miners were informed of the presence of radioactivity at the mine, however.

Gross regional product
The Gross regional product of Donbas was ₴250 billion (7.0 billion EUR) in 2020. Donbas in 2020 generated around 6% of Ukraine GDP.

See also

 Russian occupation of Luhansk Oblast
 Russian occupation of Donetsk Oblast
 Donbass Arena
 HC Donbass, an ice hockey team based in Donetsk bearing the name of the region
 Russians in Ukraine

Notes

References

External links

 "Deconstructing the Donbass", overview of the 2014–2015 conflict,  midwestdiplomacy.com
 "The coal-mining racket threatening Ukraine's economy" by BBC News
 Bulletin board "Объявления Донбасса",  donbass.men

 
Regions of Russia
Geographic regions of Ukraine
Economy of Ukraine
Geography of Donetsk Oblast
Geography of Luhansk Oblast
Geography of Dnipropetrovsk Oblast
Geography of Rostov Oblast